The Deadlys Awards was an annual celebration of Australian Aboriginal and Torres Strait Islander achievement in music, sport, entertainment and community.

Music
Most Promising New Talent in Music: Sharnee Fenwick
Single Release of the Year: Lonesome But Free - Troy Cassar-Daley
Album Release of the Year: Under the Mango Tree - The Pigram Brothers
Band of the Year: Troy n Trevlyn & The Tribe
Music Artist of the Year: Troy Cassar-Daley
Jimmy Little Award for Lifetime Achievement in Aboriginal and Torres Strait Music: Roger Knox
Excellence in Film & Theatrical Score: David Milroy – Windmill Baby

Sport
Most Promising New Talent in Sport:	Patrick Mills
 Outstanding Achievement in AFL:	Adam Goodes
Outstanding Achievement in Rugby League:	Johnathan Thurston
Male Sportsperson of the Year:	Anthony Mundine
Ella Award for Lifetime Achievement in Aboriginal and Torres Strait Islander Sport:	Lloyd McDermott
Female Sportsperson of the Year	Lydia Williams

The arts
Dancer of the Year:	Patrick Thaiday
Outstanding Achievement in Film and Television:	Peter Djiggir, Ten Canoes
Outstanding Achviement in Literature:	Kylie Belling, Gary Foley and John Harding – The Dirty Mile, a History of Indigenous Fitzroy
Outstanding Achievement in Entertainment:	Mark Olive
Visual Artist of the Year:	Gulumbu Yunupingu
Actor of the Year:	Jamie Gulpilil

Community
DEST Award for Outstanding Achievement in Aboriginal and Torres Strait Islander Education:	Stan Grant
Outstanding Achievement in Aboriginal and Torres Strait Islander Health:	Mick Adams
Broadcaster of the Year:	Paulette Whitton, Koori Radio, Sydney NSW
New Apprentice of the Year	Nicole Zimmerman

External links
Deadlys 2006 winners at Vibe

The Deadly Awards
2006 in Australian music
Indigenous Australia-related lists